is a Japanese actress and comedian who has appeared in a number of television programmes, feature films and stage productions. She is also the special deputy mayor of Toyama, Toyama.

Biography
She was born on 14 January 1959 in Toyama, Toyama (formerly Yatsuo, Nei District).

After going to Yao High School, she went to Meiji University Department of literature. After graduating from university, she joined the Gekidan Tokyo Vodovil Show, but withdrew in 1984, and launched Wahaha-Hompo with Masahiro Sato and Masami Hisamoto. Since then she has broadened her range of activities for films, television dramas, and variety shows.

In early days of her career, she appeared as a recurring role in the "Mysterious Comedy Series" produced by Fuji TV and Toei.

She played the role of a high school teacher in the film The Fast and the Furious: Tokyo Drift produced by Universal Pictures in the United States in June 2006 which was her Hollywood debut.

Personal life
At the age of 28, she married a stage director of Wahaha-Hompo.

She joined Soka Gakkai in 1987 and later joined the Central Committee of the Arts Department.

Filmography

TV programmes

Nationwide and Kanto Local
 NHK

 Nippon TV

 Tokyo Broadcasting System

 Fuji Television

 TV Asahi

 TV Tokyo

Other local
 Asahi Broadcasting Corporation

 Chūkyō Television Broadcasting

 Kitanihon Broadcasting

 Tulip Television

 Ishikawa TV

 Kansai Telecasting Corporation

TV dramas
 NHK

 Nippon TV

 Fuji Television

 Tokyo Broadcasting System

 TV Asahi

 TV Tokyo

One-off TV dramas
 Nippon TV

 Tokyo Broadcasting System

 Fuji Television

 TV Asahi

 TV Tokyo

Films

Dubbing

Direct-to-video
 Sai Enterprise

 Nikkatsu

Radio programmes

Television advertisements

Stage

Discography
 Wahaha-Hompo Women's Department Dennō Geisha Girls

 Guest participation

Bibliography
 By herself

 Co-authored

 Dialogue collections

References

External links
 
 – Ameba Blog 

1959 births
Living people
Japanese television personalities
Japanese television presenters
Japanese women comedians
Japanese women television presenters
Meiji University alumni
Members of Sōka Gakkai
People from Toyama (city)
People from Toyama Prefecture
20th-century Japanese actresses
21st-century Japanese actresses